Brian Edward Sweeney (born June 13, 1974) is an American former professional baseball pitcher who is currently the pitching coach for the Kansas City Royals of Major League Baseball (MLB). He played in MLB for the Seattle Mariners and San Diego Padres and in Nippon Professional Baseball (NPB) for the Hokkaido Nippon-Ham Fighters, in addition to coaching for the Cleveland Guardians.

Sweeney graduated from Archbishop Stepinac High School in White Plains, New York in 1992. He graduated from Mercy College in New York, where he was a starting pitcher.

He signed a minor league contract with the Seattle Mariners and reported to Tacoma Rainiers on April 15, 2010.

On June 15, 2010, he was called up to replace Ian Snell, who was designated for assignment.

On November 3, 2010, Sweeney was claimed off waivers by the Arizona Diamondbacks.

Sweeney signed a minor league contract with the New York Mets on May 5, 2011. On January 27, 2012, he signed a minor league contract with the Seattle Mariners.

The Philadelphia Phillies named Sweeney as pitching coach for their rookie league Gulf Coast League Phillies for the 2015 season.  From 2016 to 2017, he was the pitching coach for their Single-A affiliate Lakewood BlueClaws.

Sweeney was hired by the Indians as a major league coach on December 11, 2017. Sweeney was promoted to bullpen coach on October 31, 2019.

References

External links

Living people
1974 births
2013 World Baseball Classic players
Águilas del Zulia players
American expatriate baseball players in Japan
Baseball players from New York (state)
Buffalo Bisons (minor league) players
Cardenales de Lara players
Cleveland Indians coaches
Durham Bulls players
Hokkaido Nippon-Ham Fighters players
Lafayette Leopards players
Lancaster JetHawks players
Major League Baseball pitchers
Mercy Mavericks baseball players
Minor league baseball coaches
Navegantes del Magallanes players
American expatriate baseball players in Venezuela
New Haven Ravens players
Portland Beavers players
San Antonio Missions players
San Diego Padres players
Seattle Mariners players
Somerset Patriots players
Sportspeople from Yonkers, New York
Tacoma Rainiers players
Archbishop Stepinac High School alumni